State Route 630 (SR 630) is a  east–west state highway in the northeastern quadrant of the U.S. state of Ohio. The western terminus of SR 630 is at a signalized intersection with SR 170 in the northern end of the village of New Middletown. Upon crossing the border, SR 630 becomes Pennsylvania Route 317 (PA 317), which continues east to Bessemer.

SR 630 was created in the late 1930s. The two–lane highway is provides a connection between PA 317 and the Ohio state highway system.

Route description
SR 630 runs entirely within the southeastern quadrant of Mahoning County.  It commences from the signalized intersection of SR 170 and Calla Road in the northwestern corner of New Middletown.  Heading east from there, SR 630 passes amidst a number of homes within the village prior to where it meets Struthers Road.  Passing into rural Springfield Township, SR 630 passes amidst a blend of woods and farmland, with a number of homes lining the highway.  It goes on to intersect Rapp Road, Felger Street and Metz Road.  SR 630 soon meets State Line Road and the Pennsylvania state line, where the route comes to an end and turns into PA 317, which continues east in the direction of Bessemer.

SR 630 is not including within the National Highway System.

History
The SR 630 designation was first applied in 1937.  It has maintained the same routing in the vicinity of New Middletown since its inception.  The only change related to SR 630 through its history is that the highway that it met at its western terminus when first designated was not known as SR 170, but rather its predecessor, SR 90.  SR 630 has been paved for the duration of its existence.

Major intersections

References

External links

630
Transportation in Mahoning County, Ohio